The Russian All-People's Union (ROS; ; Rossiyskiy obshchenarodnyy soyuz, ROS) is a Russian conservative political party formed in October 1991. In 2001, it merged into the People's Union. In 2008, it was reorganized when the Narodnaya Volya dissolved itself. Its leader is Sergey Baburin.

The organization was founded by Russian nationalist-oriented members of the Russian Platform of the CPSU, and was launched on 26 October 1991 by Russian Supreme Soviet deputies of the faction Rossiya. According to Nikolai Pavlov, one of the ROS leaders, the party was established as a "patriotic and democratic" force with the aim of uniting parties of socialist orientation. Pavlov also stated that they had similar positions with more centrist organizations like the Cadet Party of Mikhail Astafyev, Viktor Aksiuchits' Christian Democratic Party of Russia, and the Democratic Party of Russia; one of the ROS member organizations in 1992 was the Russian Party of Communists, which was led by A. Kryuchkov. The ROS was part of the United Opposition and later National Salvation Front, belonging to the FNS right-wing faction. Besides socialist tendencies, the ROS had connections with traditional Russian nationalists and monarchists, and promoted pan-Slavist policies, including support for Serbia's expansion.

The party published newspaper Vremya (Time). The ROS took part in the 1995 Russian legislative election within the bloc Power to the People!, which was led by Baburin and Nikolai Ryzhkov. It won 1.6% of votes, failing to pass the 5% barrier; the ROS got nine seats, all from majoritarian districts. The party co-operated with other formations of nationalist-communist orientation, such as the Communist Party of Russian Federation, whose candidate Gennady Zyuganov (supported by the ROS) was defeated in the 1996 Russian presidential election by incumbent Boris Yeltsin. In 2001, the ROS joined with three other nationalist parties to form the People's Union (Narodnaya Volya). In 2008, the ROS was reorganized when Narodnaya Volya dissolved itself.

On 22 December 2017, the ROS nominated Sergey Baburin as its candidate for the 2018 Russian presidential election. On 24 December, Baburin filed registration documents with the Central Election Commission (CEC). The CEC rejected Baburin's bid on 25 December because it identified violations in the information provided regarding 18 of his party's 48 representatives. Baburin resubmitted the documents, and they were approved by the CEC.

Electoral results

Presidential elections

Legislative elections

See also 
 Liberal Democratic Party of Russia
 List of political parties in Russia
 Paternalistic conservatism
 Pochvennichestvo
 Social conservatism

References

External links 
 Official website 

1991 establishments in Russia
1991 establishments in the Soviet Union
National conservative parties
Nationalist parties in Russia
Political organizations based in Russia
Political parties established in 1991
Political parties in the Soviet Union
Registered political parties in Russia
Right-wing parties in Europe
Russian nationalist parties
Social conservative parties